The Tewantin National Park is a 13 square kilometre national park in Queensland, Australia. It consists of five individual areas west of Noosa Heads in the Wide Bay-Burnett region about 115 kilometres north of Brisbane and 125 km south of Hervey Bay.  The park is divided into disconnected sections within Lake Macdonald, Tinbeerwah, Tewantin and Noosaville.

The national park protects coastal rainforest, bright eucalyptus forest and the last remnants of Wallum Heath between Noosa and Cooroy. Mount Tinbeerwah (265 m) is composed of solidified lava, which was created by volcanic activity millions of years ago. In its surroundings you can find the endangered swamp stringybark (Eucalyptus conglomerata) with its many trunks, gray, fibrous bark and bunches of white flowers.

Many amphibians live in the park, including the nearly endangered tusked frog (Adelotus brevis) and the endangered or threatened green-thighed frog, wallum froglet, and giant barred frog. About 70 different bird species have been observed in the park, including the almost endangered red-browed treecreeper.

Access
The national park is accessible from the Cooroy-Noosa Road.

Facilities
Camping is not allowed, but there are designated trails. Climbing, mountain biking and horseback riding are permitted.

See also

 Protected areas of Queensland

References

National parks of Queensland
Shire of Noosa